Mrs. Madhuri Dixit was a comedy television show broadcast on Zee TV in mid 1997. Renuka Shahne played the titular role of Madhuri, while Tushar Dalvi played her husband, Champak Dixit. Directed by: Rajan Waghdhare

Cast 
Renuka Shahane as Madhuri Dixit
Tushar Dalvi as Champak Dixit (Madhuri's husband)
Pratiksha Lonkar as Mamta (Madhuri's Friend )
Jatin Kanakia as Bunty (Mamta's husband)
Rakesh Paul as Sandy, (Madhuri’s brother)
Shail Chaturvedi as Chairman of Champak’s company
Dinyar Contractor as Bunty’s Boss

References 

Zee TV original programming
1990s Indian television series
Indian comedy television series